Senator Janeway may refer to:

Edward G. Janeway (1901–1986), Vermont State Senate
Harold Janeway (fl. 2000s–2010s), New Hampshire State Senate